The 2014 Rally Argentina was the fifth round of the 2014 World Rally Championship season. The event was based in Villa Carlos Paz, Argentina, and started on 8 May and finished on 11 May after fourteen special stages, totaling 405.1 competitive kilometres.

Finnish driver Jari-Matti Latvala won the Rally Argentina for the first time, taking his second of three victories during the 2014 season.

Entry list

Results

Event standings

Special stages

Power Stage
The "Power stage" was a  stage at the end of the rally.

Standings after the rally

WRC

Drivers' Championship standings

Manufacturers' Championship standings

Other

WRC2 Drivers' Championship standings

WRC3 Drivers' Championship standings

Junior WRC Drivers' Championship standings

References

Results – juwra.com/World Rally Archive
Results – ewrc-results.com

Argentina
Rally Argentina
Rally